After the experience of the Bavarian Army in the war against Prussia, in 1868 the Bavarian War Minister Siegmund Freiherr von Pranckh fundamentally reformed the army. His main measures were:
 Reforms of the military reinforcement system: 
Abolition of the practice of avoiding conscription by hiring a paid substitute, called a Einsteher ("Proxy") or Einstandsmann ("Stand-In"), to volunteer to take their place.
Creation of Dienstzeit (compulsory military service-time requirement) of three years for all able-bodied men. 
Introduction of the Einjährig-Freiwilliger (“One-year volunteer”) system after the Prussian model.
 Abolition of Bavaria's Landwehr. The term Landsturm was henceforth used for the older members of the Reserve.
 Foundation of the I Royal Bavarian Corps in Munich and II Royal Bavarian Corps in Würzburg

 The Bavarian Cadet Corps was put on an equal footing with a Realgymnasium.

Through these reforms, the Bavarian Army was able to participate significantly in the Franco-Prussian War.

References

Military of Bavaria
1868 in military history
1868 in Bavaria